The Hill Hotel is a historic former hotel located in Portland, Oregon, United States, built in 1904. It is listed on the National Register of Historic Places The building is now known as the Victorian Apartments.

References

1904 establishments in Oregon
Apartment buildings on the National Register of Historic Places in Portland, Oregon
Hotel buildings completed in 1904
Hotel buildings on the National Register of Historic Places in Portland, Oregon
Northwest District, Portland, Oregon
Portland Historic Landmarks
Individually listed contributing properties to historic districts on the National Register in Oregon